Turtle Bay may refer to:

Turtle Bay, Manhattan, a neighborhood in New York City
Turtle Bay, O'ahu, in the Hawaiian archipelago
Turtle Bay, Bermuda, bay in Bermuda
Turtle Bay, U.S. Virgin Islands, bay and beach in U.S. Virgin Islands
Turtle Bay, Texas, a former area of Galveston Bay now enclosed as Lake Anahuac
Turtle Bay (album), a 1973 album by Herbie Mann
Turtle Bay Exploration Park in Redding, California